The Banat Military Frontier or simply Banat Frontier was a district of the Habsburg monarchy's Military Frontier located in the Banat region. It was formed out of territories of the Banat of Temeswar. Today, the territory is split between Hungary, Serbia and Romania.

Geography

The Frontier was divided into Serb (Illyrian), German (Danube Swabian) and Romanian (Vlach) sections. It included parts of modern-day Banat and the south-eastern part of Bačka region, known as Šajkaška. Some of the important cities and places were: Pančevo, Bela Crkva, Titel, Žabalj, Alibunar, Kovin, and Caransebeş.

History

The military province of Habsburg monarchy known as the Banat of Temeswar was created in 1718. In 1751, Maria Theresa introduced a civil administration for the northern part of the province. The southern part remained under military administration and was organized as the Banat Military Frontier. In 1849, this part of the Military Frontier bordered the Principality of Serbia to the south, Voivodeship of Serbia and Banat of Temeschwar to the north, Transylvania and Wallachia to the east, and the Slavonian Military Frontier to the west. It remained a part of the Habsburg Military Frontier until it was abolished in 1871.

Administration

Demographics

1857
Total of 386,255 people:

 314,514 (81.43%) Eastern Orthodox
 51,860 (13.43%) Roman Catholics
 19,418 (5.03%) Evangelists
 393 (0.1%) Jews
 70 (0.01%) others

See also
 Slavonian Military Frontier
 Croatian Military Frontier
 Transylvanian Military Frontier

References

Sources

External links
Map
Map
Map

Military Frontier
History of Banat
Modern history of Romania
1751 establishments in the Habsburg monarchy
1873 disestablishments in Austria-Hungary
Disestablishments in the Kingdom of Hungary (1867–1918)